Shush Street is a street in southern central Tehran, Iran.

References 

Streets in Tehran